Joseph Potter Cotton (July 22, 1875 – March 10, 1931) was an American politician and lawyer who served as the United States Under Secretary of State from 1929 until his death in 1931.

Biography

Cotton was born in Newport, Rhode Island on July 22, 1875. He earned a bachelor of arts degree from Harvard College in 1896 and graduated from Harvard Law School in 1900. In New York, he worked as a prominent lawyer and in 1907 became a member of the law firm Cravath, Henderson and De Gersdorff. In 1910, he joined with John Coit Spooner in the firm of Spooner & Cotton. In 1915, he went to Washington to work as a federal attorney for the Alaskan Railway Commission. He became a law partner of William Gibbs McAdoo in 1919 and founded the firm of McAdoo, Cotton & Franklin. He also served as the Chief of the US Food Administration's Meat Division  where he became friends with President Herbert Hoover who then served as the head of the United States Food Administration.

Cotton was a major policy adviser to Hoover and was appointed as the Under Secretary of State on June 7, 1929 when the latter became President. He served as the acting Secretary of State, and succeeded in maintaining the dominant influence of the United States, when Henry Stimson went to assist as the Chairman of the U.S. delegation to the London Naval Conference 1930.

Cotton was admitted at Johns Hopkins Hospital in Baltimore from an infection of the spinal cord where surgeons removed a tumor from his spine. He developed blood-poisoning in his right eye, which had to be removed. He underwent two major operations and succumbed to complications from infections on March 10, 1931.

Works
 in two volumes Vol. 1, Vol. 2 (New York and London).

References

Further reading
 

1875 births
1931 deaths
United States Under Secretaries of State
Politicians from Newport, Rhode Island
Harvard Law School alumni